Dětenice is a municipality and village in Jičín District in the Hradec Králové Region of the Czech Republic. It has about 700 inhabitants.

Administrative parts
Villages of Brodek and Osenice are administrative parts of Dětenice.

Sights
Dětenice is known for the Dětenice Castle.

Notable people
Miloš Hájek (1921–2016), historian, politician and resistance fighter

References

External links

Dětenice Castle

Villages in Jičín District